Kerguelenella stewartiana is a species of small, air-breathing sea snail, a marine pulmonate gastropod mollusk in the family Siphonariidae, the false limpets.

References

 Powell A. W. B., New Zealand Mollusca, William Collins Publishers Ltd, Auckland, New Zealand 1979 

Siphonariidae
Gastropods described in 1939